Songs of Ireland are Irish songs

Songs of Ireland may also refer to:
Songs of Ireland 1926 film directed by James A. FitzPatrick with Peggy Shaw and James Knight
Songs of Ireland, album by Mary O'Hara 1958 Tradition  LP 1024 
Songs of Ireland, another album by Mary O'Hara Decca-Emerald 1967
Songs of Ireland, album by Kenneth McKellar 1964
Songs of Ireland, album by Steve Benbow 1966
Songs of Ireland, album by The Ed Sullivan Orchestra and Chorus 1968
Songs of Ireland (Brobdingnagian Bards album) 2002
Songs of Ireland, album by James Kilbane 2008